Alexandru Bantoș (born 23 June 1950 in Hiliuți) is a writer and journalist from Moldova. He is the editor in chief of Limba Română

Biography
Alexandru Bantoș was born to Bantoș Nichita and Bantoș Agafia on 23 June 1950 in Hiliuți, Rîșcani. He is the editor in chief of Limba Română, a magazine founded in 1991. Also, he is the director of «Casa Limbii Române "Nichita Stănescu"».

Awards
 National Order "For Merit", Romania, 2000.
 Order of Work Merit, Moldova.

References

External links 
 Nicolae Dabija, UN STRĂJER: ALEXANDRU BANTOȘ
 Alexandru Bantoș, Cavalerul…
 Alexandru BANTOȘ
 Limba Română

1950 births
Living people
Moldovan journalists
Male journalists
Moldovan writers
Moldovan male writers
Moldova State University alumni
Romanian people of Moldovan descent
People from Rîșcani District
Recipients of the Order of Work Glory